Hermann Jantzen (28 May 1866-13 November 1959) was a Christian Mennonite missionary to Russian Turkestan. 

When he was a teenager, Jantzen's family followed Claas Epp, Jr. to Central Asia on the Great Trek. He became a court interpreter for Muhammad Rahim II in the Khanate of Khiva before rising through the ranks as an interior ministry official for Russian Turkestan. Later in life, he became a missionary in what is now Uzbekistan, Kazakhstan and Kyrgyzstan. His life is noted for positive relationships with his Muslim neighbors, harrowing pursuits by Russian authorities, and his work on the mission field.

References
Hermann Jantzen, Memoirs of Hermann Jantzen: missionary to Turkestan, Caucasus and Bulgaria, refugee from Bolshevik Russia
Hermann Jantzen, Mennonites in Turkestan: A 1923 Portrait

External links
Jantzen, Hermann (1866-1959) at Global Anabaptist Mennonite Encyclopedia Online

Russian Mennonites
German Mennonites
1866 births
1959 deaths
Russian Protestant missionaries
German Protestant missionaries
Protestant missionaries in Russia
Protestant missionaries in Uzbekistan
Mennonite missionaries
Protestant missionaries in Kazakhstan
Protestant missionaries in Kyrgyzstan